Federal Highway 144 (Carretera Federal 144) is a Federal Highway of Mexico. The highway travels from San Salvador el Seco in the northwest to south of Azumbilla in the southeast.

References

144